Here's to the Ones marks the second album from Rhett Walker Band. Essential Records released the project on October 14, 2014. Rhett Walker Band worked with producers Ed Cash and Paul Moak to create the album.

Reception

Signaling in a four star out of five review for CCM Magazine, Andy Argyrakis citing, the band are "Tossing a little more fuel on the southern-fried gives Rhett Walker Band's sophomore project more gusto than its already heralded 2012 debut Come To The River." In tandem with the four star rating, Jesus Freak Hideout's Alex Caldwell recognizing, "Here's To The Ones is a rare treat in that both the music and the message sound equally authentic, and shows that Walker, in all his grittiness and imperfections, still has his focus in the right place." Tim Holden, writing for Cross Rhythms in an eight out of ten review, emphasizing, "Rhett Walker Band's second record label album outing continues the gritty Southern rock sound with attitude... If it is rock with more than a hint of southern flavour and a bit of spiritual meat to the lyrics you're looking for, then 'Here's To The Ones' is definitely an album to get hold of." Awarding the album four stars from 365 Days of Inspiring Media, Joshua Andre writes, "Rhett Walker Band have released a sophomore album that exceeds my expectations, as there’s plenty of genres encompassed here, enough to make most people happy." Jackie Labuguen, rating the album 5.0 out of five for Christian Music Review, says, "Here's To The Ones, is sure to elicit a strong positive response from their audience." Awarding the album an eight out of ten from Christ Core, Jacob Neff writes, "Here's To The Ones is an ode to living life to the fullest, hearts full of love and amazed at the grace and mercy of our God, for as long as we’re on this earth."

Track listing

Personnel
Rhett Walker Band
 Rhett Walker – lead vocals, acoustic guitar, electric guitar 
 Joe Kane – acoustic guitar, electric guitar, slide guitar, banjo, mandolin, vocals 
 Kevin Whitsett – bass guitar, upright bass, vocals 
 Kenny Davis – guitars, drums, percussion, vocals 

Additional musicians
 Paul Moak – acoustic piano, Hammond B3 organ, acoustic guitar, electric guitar, banjo, mandolin, pedal steel guitar, percussion, vocals 
 Scotty Wilbanks – Hammond B3 organ (3)
 Jason Webb – Hammond B3 organ (8)
 Pastor Mark Canipe – intro (1)
 Ed Cash – backing vocals (3, 8)

Production
 Paul Moak – producer (1, 2, 4, 5, 6, 9–14), engineer (1, 2, 4, 5, 6, 7, 9–14), mixing (14)
 Ed Cash – producer (3, 8), engineer (3, 8), mixing (3, 8)
 Seth Mosley – additional production (3, 8)
 Rhett Walker Band – producers (7, 15)
 Joe Kane – mixing (1, 2, 4, 5, 6, 7, 9–13, 15)
 Justin March – assistant engineer (1, 2, 4, 5, 6, 7, 9–14)
 Devin Vaughan – assistant engineer (1, 2, 4, 5, 6, 7, 9–14)
 Max Corwin – assistant engineer (1, 2, 4, 5, 6, 7, 9–14)
 Zack Zinck – assistant engineer (1, 2, 4, 5, 6, 7, 9–14)
 Ryan Meadoo – assistant engineer (3, 8)
 Cody Norris – assistant engineer (3, 8)
 Brad Blackwood – mastering at Euphonic Masters (Memphis, Tennessee)
 Jason Root – A&R production
 Lani Crump – production coordinator
 Beth Lee – art direction
 Tim Parker – art direction, design
 Joshua Black Wilkins – photography
 Kelly Henderson – hair stylist, make-up
 Stephanie Harrison – wardrobe assistant

Charts

References

2014 albums
Essential Records (Christian) albums